Jan Lüke (born 29 January 1989) is a German lightweight rower. He won a gold medal at the 2010 World Rowing Championships in Karapiro with the lightweight men's eight.

References

1989 births
Living people
German male rowers
World Rowing Championships medalists for Germany
People from Georgsmarienhütte
Sportspeople from Lower Saxony